Lord Derby Academy is  a coeducational secondary school. It has an academy status located in Huyton in the English county of Merseyside.

Previously known as Knowsley Hey High School, in 2009 the school was merged with Bowring Comprehensive School to form Huyton Sports and Arts Centre for Learning on the site of Knowsley Hey. The school was completely rebuilt under the Building Schools for the Future programme. In February 2014 the school converted to academy status and was renamed Lord Derby Academy. The school is part of The Dean Trust which also includes Ashton-on-Mersey School in Sale as well as Broadoak School and Forest Gate Academy. In 2019 Lord Derby Academy was found to be "Requires Improvement" by Ofsted. They disagreed with this, which led to the delayed publication of the Ofsted Report. The report details how the leaders bear an over generous view of the school and how inadequate progress is being made by the pupils, at fault of the teachers.

Notable former pupils

Knowsley Hey School

Conor McAleny, footballer
Tim Stratford, Archdeacon of Leicester
Jess Molyneux, news reporter for Liverpool Echo
Anthony Walker, school student, murdered in 2005 by a classmate

References

External links
Lord Derby Academy official website
The Dean Trust

Secondary schools in the Metropolitan Borough of Knowsley
Academies in the Metropolitan Borough of Knowsley
People educated at Lord Derby Academy